"I Want to Be Free" is a song first recorded by Elvis Presley as part of the soundtrack for his 1957 motion picture Jailhouse Rock.

Its first release on record was on the soundtrack EP Jailhouse Rock in 1957.

In some countries in 1958 the song was released on a single as the reverse side to "(You're So Square) Baby I Don't Care".

Writing 
The song was written by Jerry Leiber and Mike Stoller specially for Presley's 1957 film Jailhouse Rock.  They wrote several famous songs: "Jailhouse Rock", "(You're So Square) Baby I Don't Care", "Treat Me Nice" and "I Want to Be Free" in one afternoon.

Recording 
Presley recorded "I Want to Be Free" on May 3, 1957, at the soundtrack recordings for the MGM movie Jailhouse Rock (that took place on April 30 and May 3, 1957, at the Radio Recorders Studio and on May 9 at the MGM Soundstage in Hollywood, California).

Track listing 
7" single (1958)
 "(You're So Square) Baby I Don't Care"
 "I Want to Be Free"

References

External links 
 Elvis Presley With The Jordanaires - (You're So Square) Baby I Don't Care / I Want To Be Free at Discogs

1957 songs
Elvis Presley songs
Songs written by Jerry Leiber and Mike Stoller